Jamaica competed at the 2012 Summer Paralympics in London, United Kingdom from August 29 to September 9, 2012.

Medallists

Athletics 
Between 1992 and 2012, Jamaica had problems performing on the track.  In this period, they won only two gold medals.  One was won in 2012 by Alphonso Cunningham in the men's javelin throw F52/53 event.
Men's Field Events

Women's Field Events

Media 
There was no domestic broadcast rights holder for the Paralympic Games for 2012 and 2016 Games.

See also

 Jamaica at the 2012 Summer Olympics

References

Nations at the 2012 Summer Paralympics
2012
2012 in Jamaican sport